Todd Mitchell Haywood (born 1977) is an alpine skier from New Zealand.

In the 2002 Winter Olympics at Salt Lake City he came 51st in the Slalom.

References

External links  
 
 

Living people
1977 births
New Zealand male alpine skiers
Olympic alpine skiers of New Zealand
Alpine skiers at the 2002 Winter Olympics